The  is a commuter electric multiple unit (EMU) train operated by the private railway operator Hanshin Electric Railway in Japan since 2010.

Design
The design was based on the earlier 5500 series trains, which were themselves developed from the 8000 series trains. The bogies are the same as those used on the 1000 series trains.

Operations
Together with the 5500 series trains, the 5550 series set is primarily used on Hanshin Main Line services.

Formation
, one four-car set is in service, formed as shown below, with three motored "M" cars and one non-powered trailer "T" car. The "Mc" car is at the Umeda end.

Each motored car is fitted with one single-arm pantograph.

Interior
Passenger accommodation consists of longitudinal bench seating throughout, with sculpted seats finished in blue moquette.

History
The only train entered revenue service 29 December 2010.

References

External links

 Hanshin 5550 series (Japan Railfan Magazine Online) 

Electric multiple units of Japan
5550 series
Train-related introductions in 2010
1500 V DC multiple units of Japan
Alna Sharyo rolling stock